NASAMike, or Mike Comberiate, is an American engineer who served as Program Manager at NASA-Goddard Space Flight Center in Greenbelt, Maryland.

Comberiate's career with NASA started in the Apollo Program. He started the Summer Robotics Boot Camp for students from many different nations. Comberiate was a pioneer in applying NASA technologies to resolve long-standing communications impasses in Antarctica, and in using the Antarctic environment for improving communications and data collection from polar orbiting satellites and for various robotics missions.

References

Living people
American roboticists
NASA people
Year of birth missing (living people)